The 2004 WNBA Finals was the championship series of the 2004 WNBA season, and the conclusion of the season's playoffs. The Seattle Storm, second-seeded champions of the Western Conference, defeated the Connecticut Sun, top-seeded champions of the Eastern Conference, two games to one in a best-of-three series. This was Seattle's first title.

The Storm made their first appearance in the Finals in franchise history. The Sun made their first appearance in the Finals in franchise history.

Going into the series, neither team had won a WNBA championship. The Houston Comets hold the record with four championships won.

The Storm had a 20–14 record (.588), good enough to receive home-court advantage over the Sun (18–16).

The 2004 Finals was the last time two teams had entered the series without having participated in them before.

Road to the finals

Regular season series
The Sun and the Storm split the regular season series:

Game summaries
All times listed below are Eastern Daylight Time.

Game 1

Katie Douglas and the Connecticut Sun took care of business at home to open the WNBA Finals. Douglas overcame an early ankle injury to score 18 points as the Sun held on for a 68–64 victory over the Seattle Storm, taking a 1–0 lead in the best-of-three championship series. The win was Connecticut's fifth straight after opening the postseason with a loss.

Douglas, who suffered a minor ankle sprain in the first half, nailed three 3-pointers and hit a pair of free throws in the closing seconds to finish the scoring.

Wendy Palmer had 16 points and Lindsay Whalen chipped in 11 and a franchise playoff-record nine assists for the Sun, who used a 14-7 run to close the first half to grab a 33-29 lead at intermission.

Connecticut built its edge to 63-47 on a bucket by Asjha Jones with 7:20 remaining and survived a late 16–5 run by the Storm to get a win in its WNBA Finals debut.

Betty Lennox scored 17 points and Lauren Jackson had 16 for Seattle. Lennox nailed a 3-pointer with 17 seconds remaining to pull the Storm to within two points, but they failed to convert their final three shots before the final buzzer.

Game 2

Betty Lennox won her shootout with Nykesha Sales and extended the WNBA Finals to a decisive game.

Lennox scored 27 points as the Seattle Storm survived a record-setting performance by Sales and held on for a 67–65 victory over the Connecticut Sun that evened the WNBA Finals at one game each.

Lennox made 11-of-16 shots. She scored 16 points in the second half, when the Sun - who never led - erased a 13-point deficit and tied the game.

Sales, who set a WNBA Finals record with 32 points, sank a jumper that evened it, 57–57, with 5:20 to go. Lennox answered with four points in a 6–0 burst that gave the Storm the lead for good.

Katie Douglas made a 3-pointer to halve the deficit before Lennox made a jumper at the 1:41 mark. Sales had a steal and layup, but Lennox's foul line jumper pushed the lead to 67-62 with 51 seconds remaining.

Sales made a 3-pointer before Lennox missed a jumper and Connecticut forced a jump ball. The Sun gained possession with 3.1 seconds left and ran a play for Sales, who hit the side of the backboard with a potential game-winning 3-pointer from the right corner.

Lauren Jackson had 15 points and 11 rebounds and Sue Bird scored 10 points for the Storm, who improved to 4–0 at home in the postseason. They drew 17,072 to KeyArena for this one.

Douglas scored 14 points for the Sun, who had won five straight playoff games but stumbled early in this one. They fell behind, 22–10, midway through the first half and trailed, 35–30, at halftime.

Game 3

The Seattle Storm got to the WNBA Finals behind stars Lauren Jackson and Sue Bird. They won their first title behind a player picked off the scrap heap.

Betty Lennox scored 16 of her 23 points in the second half as the Storm won the WNBA championship with a 74–60 triumph over the Connecticut Sun in the decisive third game.

Acquired in the dispersal draft from the defunct Cleveland Rockers, Lennox outshined Jackson, acknowledged as the best player in the world, and Bird, a star point guard. Lennox averaged 22.3 points in the series to earn Most Valuable Player honors.

Jackson collected 13 points and seven rebounds while Bird added eight - all in the second half - and six assists.

Playing in front of their second straight sellout crowd of 17,072, the Storm improved to a perfect 5-0 at KeyArena in the postseason. They won their last two series after losing the opener on the road.

After Nykesha Sales hit two free throws to cut Seattle's lead to 51–46 with 13:05 left, the Storm went on a 13–2 run capped by Lennox's driving layup with 6:15 to go.

Led by center Kamila Vodichkova, who scored 12 of her 14 points in the opening half, Seattle never trailed, opening a 26–14 lead with 10:17 left. Connecticut answered with a 15–3 surge over the next seven minutes to tie the game.

But the Sun went cold in the second half, missing 18 of 23 shots. Shooting guard Katie Douglas characterized the team's poor shooting, finishing 0-of-11 from the floor. She scored just six points after averaging 16 in the first two games.

Seattle coach Anne Donovan made history by becoming the first female coach to guide a team to the WNBA title.

Awards
2004 WNBA Champion: Seattle Storm	
Finals MVP: Betty Lennox

Rosters

{| class="toccolours" style="font-size: 95%; width: 100%;"
|-
! colspan="2" style="background-color: #2E8B57; color: #FFC322; text-align: center;" | 2004 Seattle Storm Finals roster
|- style="background-color: #B22222;color: #FFFFFF; text-align: center;"
! Players !! Coaches
|-
| valign="top" |
{| class="sortable" style="background:transparent; margin:0px; width:100%;"
! Pos. !! # !! Nat. !! Name !! Height !! Weight !!class="unsortable"| !! From
|-

{| class="toccolours" style="font-size: 95%; width: 100%;"
|-
! colspan="2" style="background-color: #092C57; color: #FFC322; text-align: center;" | 2004 Connecticut Sun Finals roster
|- style="background-color: #B22222;color: #FFFFFF; text-align: center;"
! Players !! Coaches
|-
| valign="top" |
{| class="sortable" style="background:transparent; margin:0px; width:100%;"
! Pos. !! # !! Nat. !! Name !! Height !! Weight !!class="unsortable"| !! From
|-

External links

Finals
Connecticut Sun
Seattle Storm
2004 in sports in Connecticut
2004 in sports in Washington (state)
Women's National Basketball Association Finals
Basketball competitions in Seattle
Basketball competitions in Connecticut
2004 in Seattle
October 2004 sports events in the United States
Sports competitions in Uncasville, Connecticut